Otteri is a developed residential area in Central Chennai, a metropolitan city in Tamil Nadu, India. Otteri is a part of Purasaiwakkam but is too distinct to be called hence locals simply refer it as Otteri.

Police station
There is a police station on Cooks road in Otteri, viz., 'Otteri Police station'.

Location
Otteri is located in between Perambur, Ayanavaram and is a part of Purasaiwalkam.

Roads
Cooks road
Ayanavaram road
Strahans road
Brick kiln road
Perambur Barracks road
Purasawalkam High road
DeMellows road
Perambur High road
Pulianthope High road.

Surroundings
Purasawalkam
Perambur
Ayanavaram
Kellys
Kilpauk
Egmore
Vepery
Doveton
Pulianthope
Pattalam, Chennai
Basin Bridge
Vyasarpadi
Choolai

Neighbourhoods in Chennai